C.B.S. Charleville (Christian Brothers School) is a secondary school located in Charleville, County Cork, Republic of Ireland.

Notable alumni

Éamon de Valera - Politician, statesman, the founder of the Fianna Fáil party. Later elected Taoiseach, followed by two terms as President of Ireland, received his secondary education in Charleville from 1896 to 1898. He said in a statement in 1921 "I regretted every moment even when I was forced to watch my youth fall away".
Archbishop Daniel Mannix of Melbourne
Rory Kiely - Cathaoirleach Of Seanad Éireann (2002).

References

External links

Secondary schools in County Cork
Congregation of Christian Brothers secondary schools in the Republic of Ireland
1866 establishments in Ireland
Educational institutions established in 1866